Stelios Skevofilakas (Skevofilax) (6 January 1939 – 10 June 2009) was a Greek professional footballer who played as a midfielder for AEK Athens and Atromitos.

Club career
Skevofilakas was born on 6 January 1939 at Nea Ionia. He started his football career at one of his neighborhood teams, Eleftheroupoli, from which he was transferred to AEK Athens in 1961 at the age of 21. He played in the midfield positions with and especially as a wide midfielder. His official debut with the yellow and black jersey was at Rizoupoli Stadium on 9 September 1961, in the victory of AEK over Egaleo by 8–0, where he provided three assists in the two goals of Nestoridis at the 40th and 43rd minute and a goal of Stamatiadis at the 65th minute. Skevofilakas won 3 championships and 2 Greek Cups, while he was a member of the team that played in the European Cup quarter finals in 1969 against Spartak Trnava, losing by a margin, the opportunity to face Johan Cruyff's Ajax in the semi-finals. The intention of the club's then manager, Branko Stanković to renew the club's roster, brought Skevofilakas to leave AEK among other players, in 1972 and move to Atromitos.

On 21 May 1973, Skevofilakas alongside Balopoulos, Psychogios and Kefalidis, who all had been released from AEK and played for Atromitos, started in the game against their former club in Peristeri, and the match ended with a 1–0 victory for the hosts. It was the first time that they played against AEK, while Lakis Nikolaou, made his maiden participation against his former team, Atromitos, with the yellow-blacks. He retired as a footballer in the summer of 1973, at the age of 34.

International career
Skevofilakas made 11 appearances for the Greece, playing in qualifying matches for the 1966 FIFA World Cup and UEFA Euro 1968. He made his debut in May 1963 at an away friendly match against Poland, which ended 4–0.

Personal life
After the end of his career Skevofilakas participated in all the events of the Veterans Association of AEK Athens, which he served as president for 8 consecutive years. On 10 June 2009, he died from stomach cancer after a brave struggle of 18 months. A few months earlier in 21 January 2009, he made a deeply emotional and unexpected visit to the gathering for the New Year of Veterans of AEK, in his capacity as their president, to wish all of them health. It was his last public appearance. On 20 January 2016, AEK organized a football tournament in his memory.

Honours

AEK Athens
Alpha Ethniki:  1963, 1968, 1971
Greek Cup: 1964, 1966

References

External links

Εδωσε νέα διάσταση στο παιχνίδι
Εφυγε από τη ζωή ο Στέλιος Σκευοφύλαξ

1939 births
2009 deaths
Deaths from stomach cancer
Greek footballers
Greece international footballers
Eleftheroupoli F.C. players
AEK Athens F.C. players
Deaths from cancer in Greece
Association football midfielders
Footballers from Athens